Paudie Mulhare (born 12 May 1976 in Banagher, County Offaly) is an Irish sportsperson. He plays hurling with his local club St Rynagh's and was a member of the Offaly senior inter-county team between 1996 and 2004.

References

1976 births
Living people
St Rynagh's hurlers
Offaly inter-county hurlers
All-Ireland Senior Hurling Championship winners